Antaeotricha purulenta is a moth in the family Depressariidae. It was described by Philipp Christoph Zeller in 1877. It is found in Guianas and Brazil.

References

Moths described in 1877
purulenta
Moths of South America